The Florida Panthers are a professional ice hockey team based in Sunrise, Florida, United States. The Panthers are members of the Atlantic Division of the Eastern Conference in the National Hockey League (NHL). The team was founded as an expansion franchise on December 10, 1992.

By the end of the 2018–19 season, 33 goaltenders and 354 skaters (forwards and defensemen) have appeared in at least one regular-season game with the Panthers. In 1996, the Panthers had their most successful season, making it to the Stanley Cup Finals, before losing to the Colorado Avalanche. However, since then the Panthers have made the NHL playoffs only four times, and as a result just six goaltenders and 79 skaters have appeared in playoff games for Florida.

Only one player in franchise history has received a major individual NHL trophy; Pavel Bure won the Maurice "Rocket" Richard Trophy twice, first after the 1999–2000 season and again the following season. However, both Jonathan Huberdeau and Aaron Ekblad were awarded the Calder Memorial Trophy as the NHL's rookie of the year. In 2008, Igor Larionov (2000–2001) was inducted into the Hockey Hall of Fame, becoming the first former Panther player to receive such an honor.

On October 24, 2007, Olli Jokinen scored two goals against the Philadelphia Flyers to become the franchise's all-time leader in both goals and points. Both marks were previously held by Scott Mellanby. Jokinen also became the all-time leader in assists, surpassing Robert Svehla. However, with the Panthers' struggles to make the playoffs, Jokinen never played a playoff game for the franchise. No one player holds as many playoff records for the Panthers as Jokinen does for the regular-season versions. Robert Svehla holds the career record for assists, Ed Jovanovski is the leader in games played, Paul Laus owns the record for most penalty minutes and Dave Lowry shares the goal scoring lead with Ray Sheppard, who also holds the franchise record for playoff points.

The Panthers' all-time goaltender records are primarily held by two players. Roberto Luongo holds the franchise regular-season records for games played, wins, losses, ties, and shutouts. As a result of being the starting goaltender for the 1996 Stanley Cup run and the 1997 playoffs, John Vanbiesbrouck holds all of the Panthers playoff records, most by a wide margin.

Key
  Appeared in a Panthers game during the 2021–2022 season.
  Hockey Hall of Famer, or retired number.

The "Seasons" column lists the first year of the season of the player's first game and the last year of the season of the player's last game. For example, a player who played one game in the 2000–2001 season would be listed as playing with the team from 2000–2001, regardless of what calendar year the game occurred within.

Statistics complete as of the 2021–22 NHL season.

Goaltenders

Skaters

Notes

a: As of the 2005–2006 NHL season, all games have a winner; teams losing in overtime and shootouts are awarded one point thus the OTL stat replacees the tie statistic. The OTL column also includes SOL (Shootout losses).

References
General

Specific

Florida Panthers
Players